The  2010 Tour de San Luis was a men's road cycling race held from 18 to January 24, 2010, in Argentina. The fourth edition of this road racing event was a multiple stage race with seven stages and a total length of 1018.4 kilometres.

Stage summary

References

External links 
Stage 1 Results
Stage 2 Results
Stage 3 Results
Stage 4 Results
Stage 5 Results
Stage 6 Results
Stage 7 Results

Tour de San Luis
Tour de San Luis
Tour de San Luis
January 2010 sports events in South America